John Whittier Treat is Professor Emeritus of East Asian Languages and Literature at Yale University, Connecticut, United States, where he teaches Japanese literature and culture. He was co-editor of the Journal of Japanese Studies. He has published numerous essays and several books on Japan-related topics. In 2008 he discussed his work with Peter Shea at the University of Minnesota.

He received his BA in Asian Studies 1975 from Amherst College, Massachusetts, and his MA and PhD in East Asian Languages and Literatures from Yale University in 1979 and 1982, respectively. In 2011 he translated Yi Kwang-su's short story, "Maybe Love" (사랑인가, 1909), which was then published in the journal Azalea by the University of Hawaiʻi Press.

Selected works

Nonfiction 
 Pools of Water, Pillars of Fire: The Literature of Ibuse Masuji (1988) 
 Contemporary Japan and Popular Culture (1995) 
 Writing Ground Zero: Japanese Literature and the Atomic Bomb (1995) 
 Great Mirrors Shattered: Homosexuality, Orientalism, and Japan (1999) 
 The Rise and Fall of Modern Japanese Literature (2018)

Fiction 
 The Rise and Fall of the Yellow House (2015) 
 Maid Service (2020) 
 First Consonants (2022)

Peer-reviewed articles 
 “Early Hiroshima Poetry.” Journal of the Association of Teachers of Japanese, vol. 20, no. 2 (November 1986), pp. 209-31.
 “Atomic Bomb Literature and the Documentary Fallacy.” Journal of Japanese Studies, vol. 14, no. 1 (Winter 1988), pp. 27-57.
 “Hiroshima and the Place of the Narrator.” The Journal of Asian Studies, vol. 48, no. 1 (February 1989), pp. 29-49.
 “Yoshimoto Banana Writes Home: Shōjo Culture and the Nostalgic Subject.” Journal of Japanese Studies, vol. 19, no. 2 (Summer 1993), pp. 353-387.
 “Symposium on Contemporary Japanese Popular Culture: Introduction.” Journal of Japanese Studies, vol. 19, no. 2 (Summer 1993), pp. 289-93.
 “The Beheaded Emperor and the Absent Figure in Contemporary Japanese Literature.” PMLA, vol. 109, no. 1 (January 1994), pp. 100-15.
 “Hiroshima, Ground Zero.” PMLA, vol. 124, no. 5 (October 2009), pp. 1883-85.
 “Introduction to Yi Kwang-su’s ‘Maybe Love’ (Ai ka, 1909).” Azalea: Journal of Korean Literature and Culture, vol. 4 (2011), pp. 315-27.
 “Choosing to Collaborate: Yi Kwang-su and the Moral Subject in Colonial Korea.” The Journal of Asian Studies, vol. 71, no. 1 (February 2012), pp. 81-102.

Other published writing 
 Studies in Modern Japanese Literature: Essays and Translations in Honor of Edwin McClellan with Alan Tansman and Dennis Washburn, eds. Center for Japanese Studies, University of Michigan (1997).

Honors
1998: Social Science Research Council Grant
1997: Association for Asian Studies, John Whitney Hall Book Prize, 1997.
1996-97: Mary Weeks Senior Fellowship, Center for the Humanities, Stanford University
1994: NEH Summer Stipend

Notes

Living people
Amherst College alumni
Yale Graduate School of Arts and Sciences alumni
Yale University faculty
American Japanologists
Japanese–English translators
American translators
Year of birth missing (living people)
Japanese literature academics
21st-century American novelists